Ernest Nnaemeka Azudialu Obiejesi (born April 17, 1960) is a Nigerian business magnate and philanthropist. He is the chairman and chief executive officer (CEO) of Nestoil and the founder of the Obijackson Foundation.

Born in Okija, Anambra (Nigeria), Azudialu Obiejesi first joined his father’s family business in 1978 before setting up his first company, Obijackson West Africa Limited, that traded goods across West Africa. Azudialu Obiejesi’s flagship company Nestoil is a Nigerian Engineering, Procurement, Construction & Commissioning (EPCC) company servicing the oil and gas industry.

Early life 
 Obiejesi attended Government College, Owerri, Imo State for his higher school education. Afterward, he worked with his father at the family’s trading business, DA Ifeanyi & Brothers Trading Company.

Career 
In 1983 he set up his first business venture Obijackson West Africa Limited, headquartered in Lagos.

In 1991,  Obiejesi incorporated Nestoil, an Engineering, Procurement, Construction & Commissioning (EPCC) company for pipeline construction, repairs and maintenance with associated facilities for dredging, river crossing and shoreline protection.

Neconde, another one of Azudialu Obiejesi's companies, specializes in the exploration and development of oil and gas assets for the production and sale of petroleum products in Nigeria.

Philanthropy 
 Obiejesi is the founder and chairman of the Obijackson Foundation, a private charity foundation based in Anambra, Southeast Nigeria. The primary goal of the foundation is to improve socio-economic well being through better access to good quality education, empowerment, skill acquisition, infrastructural development and healthcare. Cultural enrichment, particularly in the Igbo culture, is also a major focus for the Foundation through its Face of Okija Cultural Festival.

References

Nigerian businesspeople in the oil industry
1960 births
Living people